Daboura is a town in the Solenzo Department of Banwa Province in western Burkina Faso. As of 2005 it had a population of 7,285.

References

Populated places in the Boucle du Mouhoun Region
Banwa Province